Lyon-Saint-Exupéry TGV station (formerly Gare de Satolas TGV) is a railway station near Lyon, France, directly attached to Lyon–Saint-Exupéry Airport. The station was built as an addition to the airport to serve TGV trains on the LGV Rhône-Alpes, part of the main line running from Paris Gare de Lyon to Marseille Saint-Charles. It is situated about 20 km east of Lyon city centre.

Overview
Saint-Exupéry station was designed by Santiago Calatrava, cost 750 million Francs and opened on 3 July 1994, at the same time as the high-speed line to Saint-Marcel-lès-Valence. The building is mostly a combination of concrete and steel. The station has six tracks laid in a cutting. The two central tracks are isolated to permit trains to traverse the station at full speed (300 km/h) and have no platforms. The two external sets of tracks have 500 m long platforms. A small piece of land to the west is put aside for future expansion. Above the tracks, a 300 m long passenger concourse gives easy access to the platforms and is equipped with several travelators.

The railway station is linked to Lyon-Saint Exupéry Airport by a footbridge equipped with a travelator. This airport is historically the first to be served by a high-speed station. This proximity to the airport has not helped the station and it sees little use as passengers mainly use Lyon-Perrache and Lyon Part-Dieu.

Criticism
Lack of interconnection with Lyon's urban transport network is frequently cited for the station's low usage. The arrival of the Rhônexpress express tram (opened August 2010) is unlikely to change this as Lyon residents will still find it easier (and cheaper) to use the stations within the city. The main "advantage" of the station is for travellers, arriving by plane, who are travelling onwards to the east. The underutilisation of the station has led to lower access charges than for the busier downtown stations, leading to low-cost operator Ouigo making it part of its network.

Train services
The station is served by the following services:

 High speed services (TGV) from Paris to Grenoble
 High speed services (TGV) from Paris to Valence, Montélimar and Avignon
 High speed services (TGV) from Paris to Valence, Montélimar, Avignon and Miramas
 High speed services (TGV Ouigo) from Marne-la-Vallée to Lyon Saint-Exupéry, Avignon and Marseille Saint-Charles
 High speed services (TGV Ouigo) from Marne-la-Vallée to Lyon Saint-Exupéry, Nîmes and Montpellier
 High speed services (TGV Ouigo) from Paris to Grenoble, Albertville and Bourg-Saint-Maurice (seasonal)

References

External links 
 
 

Santiago Calatrava structures
Railway stations in France opened in 1994
Saint-Exupery
Airport railway stations in France
Antoine de Saint-Exupéry
Buildings and structures in Rhône (department)